Frankfurt (Oder), also known as Frankfurt an der Oder, is a city in the German state of Brandenburg. It has around 57,000 inhabitants, is one of the easternmost cities in Germany, the fourth-largest city in Brandenburg, and the largest German city on the river Oder. Frankfurt sits on the western bank of the river, opposite the Polish town of Słubice, which was a part of Frankfurt until 1945, and called Dammvorstadt until then. The large lake Helenesee lies within Frankfurt's city limits.

The name of the city makes reference to the Franks, and means Ford of the Franks, and there appears a Gallic rooster in the coat of arms of the city. The official name Frankfurt (Oder) and the older Frankfurt an der Oder are used to distinguish it from the larger city of Frankfurt am Main.

The city's recorded history began in the 13th century as a West Slavic settlement. During its history, it was successively part of the Kingdom of Poland, the Margraviate of Brandenburg, the Bohemian Crown, Prussia and Germany. After World War II, the eastern part of Frankfurt became part of Poland under the terms of the Potsdam Agreement and was renamed to Słubice, while the western part of Frankfurt became a border city of the German Democratic Republic in 1949. 

During the communist era, Frankfurt reached a population peak with more than 87,000 inhabitants at the end of the 1980s. Following German reunification, the population decreased significantly, but has stabilized in recent years at about 58,000 inhabitants. As of 2020, the city plays an important role in German–Polish relations and European integration. Frankfurt is home to the European University Viadrina, which has a campus in Słubice, the Collegium Polonicum.

Name
Frankfurt an der Oder literally means 'Frankfurt on the Oder'. In Central Margravian (Brandenburgisch dialect), the city's name is Frankfort an de Oder.

History

Prior to 1249, a West Slavic settlement named Zliwitz along with the Lubusz Land was part of the Kingdom of Poland. The Piast duke Henry the Bearded granted Zliwitz staple rights in 1225. In 1226, construction of the St. Nicholas Church (today's Friedenskirche) began. In 1249, the settlement became part of the Margraviate of Brandenburg.

The town of Frankfurt received its charter in 1253 at the Brandendamm. The early settlers lived on the western banks of the Oder; later the town was extended to the eastern bank. After a war broke out over control of the region in 1319, the town came under the control of the Duchy of Pomerania. In 1319, Wartislaw IV, Duke of Pomerania, granted new privileges to the town. The town fell again to Brandenburg in 1324. In the Late Middle Ages, the town dominated the river trade between Wrocław and Szczecin. From 1373 to 1415, along with Brandenburg, it was part of the Lands of the Bohemian Crown. In 1430, Frankfurt joined the Hanseatic League.

In April 1631, during the Thirty Years' War, Frankfurt was the site of the Battle of Frankfurt an der Oder between the Swedish Empire and the Holy Roman Empire. After a two-day siege, Swedish forces, supported by Scottish auxiliaries, stormed the town and destroyed many buildings, e.g. the Georgen Hospital. The result was a Swedish victory. By the end of the Thirty Years' War, the town's population had decreased from 12,000 inhabitants to 2,366 inhabitants.

In the 16th century the oldest church of the town (today's Friedenskirche) was secularized and was even used as a granary, and from the 17th century it served as the church of the French Huguenots.

The city was briefly occupied by the Russian Imperial Army during the Seven Years' War, in August 1759, in the prelude to the battle of Kunersdorf.

With the dissolution of the Margraviate of Brandenburg during the Napoleonic Wars, Frankfurt became part of the Province of Brandenburg in 1815. In the 19th century, Frankfurt played an important role in trade. Centrally positioned in the Kingdom of Prussia between Berlin and Posen (Poznań), on the river Oder with its heavy traffic, the town housed the second-largest annual trade fair (Messe) of the German Reich, surpassed only by that in Leipzig. In 1842, the Berlin–Frankfurt (Oder) railway was opened.

The Einsatzgruppe VI was formed in the town before it entered several Polish cities, including Poznań, Kalisz and Leszno, to commit various crimes against Poles during the German invasion of Poland, which started World War II. During World War II the Germans brought numerous forced laborers, both men and women, from Poland and the Soviet Union to the town. There was no fighting for the town in 1945 during World War II even though the town was declared a fortress (Festung) in an attempt to block the Red Army's route to Berlin. The nearly empty town was burned down by the Red Army. The postwar German–Polish border ran along the Oder, separating the Dammvorstadt on the eastern bank – which became the Polish town of Słubice – from the rest of Frankfurt. While part of communist East Germany, Frankfurt was administered within Bezirk Frankfurt (Oder). It became part of the reconstituted state of Brandenburg with German reunification in 1990.

In the post-communist era, following the collapse of its main employer VEB Halbleiterwerk, Frankfurt has suffered from high unemployment and low economic growth. Its population has fallen significantly from around 87,000 at the time of German reunification in 1990.

Today, the towns of Frankfurt and Słubice have friendly relations and run several common projects and facilities. Poland joined the European Union on 1 May 2004, and implemented the Schengen Agreement on 21 December 2007 leading to the removal of permanent border controls.

In March 2008, the Jewish community of Frankfurt celebrated its first Torah dedication since the Holocaust. The procession of the new Torah scroll began from the spot where the town's Frankfurter Synagogue stood prior to World War II, 500 meters from Germany's current border with Poland. Celebrants marched with the scroll into the town's Chabad-Lubavitch centre, where they danced with the Torah, which had been donated by members of the Chabad-Lubavitch community in Berlin.

Demography

European university

The Margraviate of Brandenburg's first university was Frankfurt's Alma Mater Viadrina, founded in 1506 by Joachim I Nestor, Elector of Brandenburg. An early chancellor, Bishop Georg von Blumenthal (1490–1550), was a notable opponent of the Protestant Reformation, as he remained a Catholic. Frankfurt also trained the noted archbishop Albert of Brandenburg around 1510, who also became a vocal opponent of the Reformation. The university was closed in 1811, and its assets divided between two new universities founded under King Frederick William III: Frederick William University of Berlin, presently Humboldt University; and the Silesian Frederick William University in Breslau, presently the University of Wrocław.

The university was refounded in 1991 with a European emphasis as the Viadrina European University, in close cooperation with the Adam Mickiewicz University in Poznań; they jointly run the Collegium Polonicum in Słubice.

Transport 

The Frankfurt (Oder) Bahnhof is a station served by the Berlin-Warszawa-Express and has regular regional connections to Magdeburg and Cottbus. Within the city, there is a network of five tram lines.

Sport

1. FC Frankfurt is the town's local football team.

International relations

Frankfurt (Oder), being located on the border to Poland, plays a special role in connection with German–Polish relations and European integration. The European University Viadrina has one of its buildings in Poland, in the neighbouring town of Słubice. The university also has a number of projects and initiatives dedicated to bringing Poland and Germany together, and offers its students pro bono Polish courses.

Another project that contributes to German–Polish integration in Frankfurt (Oder) is the Fforst House, a German-Polish student project, which has been granted support by the town's administration and by the Viadrina, having been described by the former president of the university, Gesine Schwan, as the place where "Europe begins".

Twin towns – sister cities

Frankfurt (Oder) is twinned with:

 Gorzów Wielkopolski, Poland (1975)
 Heilbronn, Germany (1988)
 Kadima-Zoran, Israel (1997)
 Nîmes, France (1976)
 Słubice, Poland (1975)
 Vantaa, Finland (1987)
 Vitebsk, Belarus (1991)
 Vratsa, Bulgaria (2009)
 Yuma, United States (1997)

Notable people

Public service & commerce 

 Aaron ben Samuel (c. 1620–1701), a rabbi
 Wilhelm Christian Benecke von Gröditzberg (1779–1860), a German banker, merchant, estate owner and art collector
 Robert von Puttkamer (1828–1900), a Prussian statesman, he also introduced reforms in German orthography.
 Hermann Wissmann (1853–1905), a German explorer and administrator in Africa
 Georg Michaelis (1857–1936), was Chancellor of Germany for a few months in 1917, grew up in Frankfurt (Oder).
 Lucie Hein (1910–1965), an East German politician (SED), she served as the senior mayor of Frankfurt 1960 to 1965.
 Gerhard Neumann (1917–1997), a German-American aviation engineer and executive for GE Aviation
 Zvi Aharoni (1921–2012), an Israeli Mossad agent instrumental in the capture of Adolf Eichmann
 Dieter Sauberzweig (1925–2005), a prominent commentator on German cultural politics (Kulturpolitiker)
 Karl-Heinz Schröter (born 1954), a German politician (Social Democratic Party)
 Alexey Gordeyev (born 1955), a Russian politician, served as the Governor of Voronezh Oblast from 2009.
 Manuela Schwesig (born 1974), a German politician (SPD), fifth Minister‐President of Mecklenburg-Vorpommern
 Franziska Giffey (born 1978), a German politician, Federal Minister of Family Affairs, Senior Citizens, Women and Youth in the Fourth Merkel Cabinet
 René Wilke (born 1984), a German politician, mayor of Frankfurt (Oder)

The arts 

 Bartholomäus Ringwaldt (1532 – c. 1599), a German didactic poet and Lutheran pastor
 Juste Chevillet (1729–1802), a French engraver, e.g. Histoire Naturelle of Georges-Louis Leclerc, Comte de Buffon
 Heinrich von Kleist (1777–1811), a German poet, dramatist, novelist, short story writer and journalist.
 Anton von Werner (1843–1915), a German painter of notable political and military events in the Kingdom of Prussia.
 Marie Goslich (1859–1936), a German journalist, photographer and magazine editor
 Herbert Bohme (1907–1971), a German poet who wrote poems and battle hymns for the Nazi Party
 René Pawlowitz (born 1975), a German electronic music producer and DJ
 Claudia Hiersche (born 1977), a German host and actress, known for her portrayal of a lesbian TV soap opera character
 Anne Pätzke (born 1982), a German illustrator and writer
 Finch (born 1990), a German rapper, battle rapper, YouTuber and Twitch streamer

Military

 Konstantin Schmidt von Knobelsdorf (1860–1936), a Prussian military officer and a general in WWI
 Vizeadmiral Hubert von Rebeur-Paschwitz (1863–1933), a German admiral, German Naval attaché to Washington
 Franz von Rintelen (1878–1949), a German Naval Intelligence officer in the United States during WWI.
 Erich Hoepner (1886–1944), a German officer, served in both World Wars, executed for his role in the 20 July Plot
 Fritz-Hubert Gräser (1888–1960), a German general in the Wehrmacht
 Theodor Busse (1897–1986), a German Army officer during WWI and WWII
 Karl-Jesko von Puttkamer (1900–1981), a German admiral, naval adjutant to Adolf Hitler during WWII
 Rudolf Brandt (1909–1948), German Nazi SS officer, executed for war crimes
 Paul-Heinrich Dähne (1921–1945), a German Luftwaffe flying ace 
 Günter Kießling (1925–2009), a German general in the Bundeswehr

Science

 Erdmann Copernicus (died 1573 while head of the university), German scholar, not related to the astronomer
 Johann Sigismund Elsholtz (1623–1688), a German naturalist, pioneer in hygiene, nutrition and holistic health
 Bernhard Siegfried Albinus (1697–1770), a German-born Dutch anatomist.
 Karl August von Bergen (1704–1759), a German anatomist and botanist, he showed the distribution of cellular membranes in animals.
 Heinrich Adolf von Bardeleben (1819–1895), a German surgeon, used Joseph Lister's methodology for antiseptic treatment of wounds.
 Hermann Rudolph Aubert (1826–1892), a German physiologist, he researched psychophysics and experimented dark adaptation 
 Georg Hermann Quincke (1834–1924), a German physicist, modified the dissociation hypothesis of Clausius.
 Reinhold Wilhelm Buchholz (1837–1876), a German zoologist who worked in herpetology, carcinology and ichthyology
 Heinrich Quincke (1842–1922), a German internist and surgeon, introduced the lumbar puncture.
 Friedrich Loeffler (1852–1915), a German bacteriologist at the University of Greifswald
 Heinrich Seilkopf (1895–1968), a German meteorologist, in 1939 coined the term jet stream for the weather phenomena originally discovered by Wasaburo Oishi.
 Käthe Mende (1878–1963), a German sociologist.

Sport

 Hermann Weingärtner (1864–1919), a German gymnast, competed at the 1896 Summer Olympics in Athens
 Klaus Köste (1943–2012), a German gymnast, gold medalist in the vault at the 1972 Summer Olympics in Munich
 Maik Bullmann (born 1967), a German Greco-Roman wrestler, competed at the 1992 and 1996 Summer Olympics
 Sebastian Köber (born 1979), a German boxer, the Heavyweight bronze medalist at the 2000 Summer Olympics
 Markus Thätner (born 1985), an amateur German Greco-Roman wrestler, competed at the 2008 Summer Olympics in Beijing
 Florian Schmidt (born 1986), a German sport shooter, competed in the 2008 and  the 2012 Summer Olympics

Films set in Frankfurt
In recent years, Frankfurt has been the setting for several notable German films:

 Halbe Treppe (Grill Point, 2002)
 Lichter (Distant Lights, 2003)
 Die Kinder sind tot (The Children Are Dead, a documentary about a 1999 murder-by-neglect in Frankfurt, 2004)
 No Exit (2004, documentary about Neo-Nazis)
 Kombat Sechzehn (Combat Sixteen, 2005)

Gallery

See also 

 Helenesee
 Hohenwalde
 Stadtarchiv Frankfurt (Oder)
 Trams in Frankfurt (Oder)
 Carl-Philipp-Emanuel-Bach-Straße

References

Bibliography

External links

The City of Frankfurt (Oder) has a website (available in English translation as well as in German and in Polish) with some limited commerce and cultural information.
 Slubice.pl – official site of Frankfurt's border town Słubice
 Frankfurt.pl & Slubice.de – a student project
 Tram-ff.de
 
 
 Frankfort a.d.O. Notgeld (emergency banknotes)

 
Members of the Hanseatic League
Divided cities
Populated places established in the 13th century
1253 establishments in Europe
Germany–Poland border crossings